Frontier Communications West Coast, Inc. was a local telephone operating company owned by Frontier Communications through Frontier Communications Northwest serving the area around Crescent City, in Del Norte County, California. 

It was founded in 1928 as the New West Coast Telephone Company. It later changed its name to West Coast Telephone Company of California, Inc., and was most recently known as Verizon West Coast, Inc. until 2010. 

Upon its sale to Frontier Communications, the company gained its last name, Frontier Communications West Coast, Inc. 

It was merged into Citizens Telecommunications Company of California in 2013.

References

Frontier Communications
Communications in California
Telecommunications companies of the United States
Companies based in Del Norte County, California
Crescent City, California
American companies established in 1928
1928 establishments in California
Companies disestablished in 2013
2013 disestablishments in California
Defunct telecommunications companies of the United States
Telecommunications companies established in 1928